Richard Peter Mehen (May 20, 1922 – December 14, 1986) was an American basketball player.

Career
Mehen played college basketball at University of Tennessee, but his career was interrupted by service in the United States Air Force during World War II alongside his brother Bernie, who was also a college and pro basketball player.

Mehen began his career with the Toledo Jeeps of the NBL, and was transferred with teammate Harry Boykoff to the Waterloo Hawks, where he played one season in the NBL and another in the NBA.  After the Hawks left the league, he had stints with the Baltimore Bullets, Boston Celtics, Fort Wayne Pistons and Milwaukee Hawks.

Stats

NBL

NBA

Regular season

Playoffs

References

1922 births
1986 deaths
All-American college men's basketball players
American men's basketball players
Baltimore Bullets (1944–1954) players
Basketball players from West Virginia
Boston Celtics players
Centers (basketball)
Fort Wayne Pistons players
Milwaukee Hawks players
Power forwards (basketball)
Sportspeople from Wheeling, West Virginia
Tennessee Volunteers basketball players
Toledo Jeeps players
Waterloo Hawks players
United States Army Air Forces personnel of World War II